Firmin: Adventures of a Metropolitan Lowlife (2006) is the second novel by author Sam Savage, about a rat runt in 1960s Boston who learns to read. In 2006 Coffee House Press published Firmin: Adventures of a Metropolitan Lowlife. In 2007 the Spanish publishing house Seix Barral purchased the world rights to Firmin, including English-language rights. The novel subsequently became a bestseller in Europe.

Plot summary
Firmin is an autobiography of a rat born, "with my eyes wide open", as the 13th child to an alcoholic mother rat with 12 nipples in the basement of a Boston bookshop in Scollay Square on November 9, 1960. As a result, Firmin the runt puts off the pangs of hunger by consuming Finnegans Wake, his initial bedding, and acquires the ability to read and think symbolically.

Initially, Firmin reads voraciously, but over time his tastes (literally and metaphorically) become more refined. But as Firmin's dreams of literature increase, his associations with his rattus society decreases proportionally. Firmin becomes attracted to strippers and characters in pornographic films in a local cinema instead of his own species, becoming a "pervert and a freak". Eventually, his family moves away from the bookshop, leaving Firmin alone, convinced that he is mad but harmless.

Falling into an existential malaise, Firmin finds his own form ugly and avoids his own reflection. He tries to leave messages to the owner of the bookshop from whom he desires friendship but being unable to speak his attempts lead to a tragedy where he is almost killed by poison. Lonely and desperate, he attempts to learn sign language, but is only to express the words "Good-bye" and "Zipper" (due to the limitations of his paws). He is attacked as he tries to communicate with humans in a local park.

Firmin is then caught at the park by an alcoholic science fiction author and bohemian political radical, Jerry Magoon, who had written about alien intelligent rats in the past. The author treats Firmin kindly, and even when he catches Firmin reading, he seems to think that the rat is just mimicking human behaviour, even to the extent when Firmin plays a toy piano.

However, when the author suffers a stroke and is hospitalised, Firmin must venture into the world again, but this time Scollay Square is in the midst of being renovated - meaning that all of Firmin's old haunts are being emptied or knocked down. Old and hallucinating, Firmin dreams of a conversation with Ginger Rogers, where he has to come to terms with his own mortality, just as Scollay Square is reaching the end of its life. In his final moments, Firmin finds the basement of the bookstore where he was born, and even the original bedding of the shreds of Finnegans Wake and has his last taste of literature.

Characters

Firmin: The first-person protagonist of the story, self-doubting, cantankerous, romantic, and humanist. Considered mad and harmless by his siblings and potentially dangerous by many humans, Firmin ponders whether he is actually an alien after reading Jerry Mongoon's novel. With excess mental development and a small stature Firmin has a disproportionately-sized head with weak limbs, and a ponderous, measured, gait. When seeing himself for the first time he considers himself ugly to the point of pain and would go to great lengths to avoid his own reflection.

Mama (Flo): Kindly described as "rotund", described as having a "kind, word face", but also "edgy", she would often return to the nest thoroughly inebriated and with alcohol-laden milk for the children. She introduces the children to the outside world, providing an orientation of the area and the best places for food and drink, and then leaves the bookshop. She is spotted only occasionally after that near a fast-food establishment.

Luweena: Sister of Firmin, who accompanies him on his first "scrounging and scraping" outside, with which she has natural talent. She is described as having a "large athletic build and once during a melee had bitten off most of Shunt's ear". Firmin initially feels sexual desire towards her, but from then on is attracted to humans.  After Mama leaves her children Luweena and Shunt are the last two of the siblings to leave Firmin at the bookshop, giving him a hug when she leaves. 

Shunt: Brother of Firmin. Described as having an unlovely shape. Shunt playfully gives Firmin a punch on the shoulder when he and Luweena leave him at the bookstore; Firmin responds by calling out an insult after them.

Peewee: Brother of Firm. Firmin claims he never showed him the slightest consideration. Like Shunt, described as having an unlovely shape. After the family has moved from the bookstore Firmin and Shunt discover him one night, having been run over by a taxi.

Sweeny, Chucky, Feenie, Mutt, Pudding, Elvis, Elvina, Humphrey, Honeychild: Other sisters and brothers of Firmin.

Norman: Owner of the Cornhill,_Boston bookshop, Pembroke Books, where Firmin is born. Firmin finds a tunnel from the basement to Norman's office and observes him from a ceiling crack. Described as showing signs of intelligence, spirituality, mental energy, and firmness, he also had dark curls shrouding his temples. Short and big-bottomed with a wide face, Norman was an excellent judge of consumer's tastes (including those who wished to purchased banned novels) and had a knowledge greater than any of the collectors who visited the store. Firmin also describes him as the first human being he loved, leaving him a gold ring and then a rose, which concerns him greatly. Norman, having once seen Firmin, feeds him poison almost killing him.

As Scollay Square's businesses were closed down, Norman's final act of defiance against the authorities is to offer as many free books as one could carry in five minutes. Sam Savage notes that this is a case of fiction imitating reality, as George Gloss, owner of the Brattle Book Shop in old Scollay Square, when faced with the destruction of his store, gave away all the books you could carry in five minutes.

Alvin Sweat: Owner of Sweat’s Sweets, next door to Pembroke Books. He tends to use colourful language.

George Vahradyan: Runs an amalgamation of drugstore and carpet emporium across the street from Pembroke Books called "Drugs and Rugs". He has a weakness for cigars.

Jerry Magoon: An impoverished writer who visits Pembroke Books, described by Alvin as "that Bohemian character... a crackpot and a drunk", who is "an experimental novelist". A short stockman with a big head, small Irish nose, big drooping mustache, a wide mouth with thin lips, and blue eyes. He always wears the same rumpled blue suit and black knit tie, giving a contradictory appearance as if an effort is made to be stylish, but with the appearance of sleeping in his clothes. Jerry is a science fiction writer with an interest in religious texts, who has written a novel about an alien species with advanced protoplasmic morphing techniques, who appear on earth as sapient rats. After Firmin attempts to communicate with other humans in a park and has his leg fractured for his efforts, Jerry rescues him, and he and Firmin form a strong friendship, Jerry even describing Firmin as "civilized" and names him "Ernie".

Major themes

Bibliophagy: The story explores the lives and thoughts of book store owners, customers, writers, and readers. Firmin is a voracious consumer of literature, in both literal and figurative senses; with sensual taste according to literate quality (e.g., Jane Eyre tastes like lettuce, soft toilet paper like Emily Post) and 'Good to eat is good to read', becomes Firmin's motto.

Loneliness: Firmin is an incredibly lonely character, trapped in a world where he can understand but cannot be understood and is even beaten for his efforts to do so. The only person who shows him real kindness is the writer Jerry Magoon who is also lonely, with only three people visiting during the entire time he is with Firmin.

Mortality: Much of the story is orientated towards the sense of ending; as Firmin is a rat, his lifespan is necessarily limited in stark contrast to his consciousness. Scollay Square is dedicated to being razed and renovated, and as a result, each business is "mortal". Firmin's one human friend, Jerry Magoon, suffers a stroke, leaving Firmin alone again. 

Self-doubt: The book opens with Firmin engaging in criticism of his own literary abilities to even generate a satisfactory opening, and settles on selecting Ford Madox Ford’s The Good Soldier: "This is the saddest story I have ever heard". Firmin also considers himself mad, trapped between the rat world of his physical self and the human world of symbolic meanings. "Firmin" notes his name is a pun "fur-man", but also associates it with his status; "Firmin the vermin."

Reception

Tim Martin in The Telegraph  notes that in Italy "that La Repubblica felt able to begin a recent article with the words: 'By now everyone must know Firmino, or have heard of him' ("Ormai tutti conoscono o hanno sentito parlare di Firmino", and Josh Lacey in The Guardian describes the book as providing "a wonderful celebration of the way reading enriches your life".

References

2006 American novels
Fiction set in the 1960s
Novels set in Boston
Coffee House Press books